St. Mary's Catholic Church is a Roman Catholic church in Kaukauna, Wisconsin. It was added to the National Register of Historic Places in 1984 for its significance in architecture and community planning and development.

References

Churches on the National Register of Historic Places in Wisconsin
Churches in the Roman Catholic Diocese of Green Bay
Gothic Revival church buildings in Wisconsin
Roman Catholic churches completed in 1898
Churches in Outagamie County, Wisconsin
1885 establishments in Wisconsin
Religious organizations established in 1885
National Register of Historic Places in Outagamie County, Wisconsin
19th-century Roman Catholic church buildings in the United States